The 1924 Kentucky Wildcats football team was an American football team that represented the University of Kentucky as a member of the Southern Conference during the 1924 college football season. In their first year under head coach Fred J. Murphy, the team compiled an overall record of 4–5 with a mark of 2–3 in conference play, tying for 14th place in the SoCon.

Schedule

References

Kentucky
Kentucky Wildcats football seasons
Kentucky Wildcats football